This is a list of flag bearers who have represented France at the Olympics.

Flag bearers carry the national flag of their country at the opening ceremony of the Olympic Games.

See also
France at the Olympics

References

France at the Olympics
France
Olympic flagbearers